Wooragee is a locality in north east Victoria, Australia.
 

A small township exists in which is located a rural fire brigade, a public hall, public toilets, a small park, a tennis court and a state primary school.

References

External links

Towns in Victoria (Australia)
Shire of Indigo